David Ray Kraayeveld (born October 26, 1955) is a former American football.  He played professionally in the National Football League (NFL) for the Seattle Seahawks in 1978 as a defensive end and defensive tackle. Kraayeveld played at the college football at Milton College and the University of Wisconsin–Whitewater.

Early life
Kraayeveld was born on October 26, 1955 in Elkhorn, Wisconsin.
He played football at the now-defunct Milton College and at the University of Wisconsin–Whitewater. His coach, Rudy Gaddini, suggested Gil Brandt of the Dallas Cowboys take a look at Kraayeveld.  Dallas scouts tested hin and put into their rookie camp for workouts. He and Dave Krieg, who also played for the Seahawks, are the only two people to have attended Milton College to play in the NFL.

Career
As a 23-year-old rookie, Kraayeveld played defensive end for the Dallas Cowboys in a preseason game in Denver on August 12, 1978 in which the Cowboys topped the Broncos, 21–14. The Seattle Seahawks claimed Kraayeveld off waivers later in the season.

12th Man
On October 29, 1978, when the Denver Broncos missed a field goal, a referee flagged the Seahawks for having a 12th man on the field. Kraayeveld was that 12th man. Used to the Dallas Cowboy policy of using the same defense on field goals as the previous down, he had remained on the field. The Broncos made the second attempt to win the game 20–17.

Family
Kraayeveld is the father of WNBA player Cathrine Kraayeveld, and is joint owner with his wife, Cynthia, and his daughter, of a condominium in Bellevue, Washington.

References

External links
 

1955 births
Living people
American football defensive ends
American football defensive tackles
Milton Wildcats football players
Seattle Seahawks players
Wisconsin–Whitewater Warhawks football players
People from Elkhorn, Wisconsin
Players of American football from Wisconsin